(born ; May 13, 1940 January 9, 1968) was a Japanese athlete who competed mainly as a marathoner. Kokichi was also a 1st lieutenant in the Japan Ground Self-Defense Force.

Running career
Tsuburaya competed at the 1964 Summer Olympics held in Tokyo, Japan, finishing sixth in the 10,000m event and lining up for the marathon as well, on the final day of competition. Abebe Bikila of Ethiopia won the race decisively, becoming the first man to defend his Olympic title in the event, having won in Rome in 1960, running barefoot. Tsuburaya entered the stadium second, but was overtaken on the final lap by the furious sprint of Britain's Basil Heatley and finished third, earning the bronze medal. Tsuburaya was mortified by the loss to Heatley, saying to fellow marathoner Kenji Kimihara, "I committed an inexcusable blunder in front of the Japanese people. I have to make amends by running and hoisting the Hinomaru in the next Olympics, in Mexico".

Shortly after the Tokyo Olympics, Tsuburaya suffered from an ongoing back problem, known as lumbago. On January9, 1968, he committed suicide by slashing his wrist in his dormitory room where he had stayed during his training period for the Mexico City Olympics.

Suicide
Tsuburaya was found dead in his dorm room, holding on to his bronze medal. His suicide was an emotional reaction to the marriage of his longtime girlfriend, Eiko, to another man.  Tsuburaya had wanted to marry Eiko, but his military bosses refused to consent to a marriage until after the 1968 Olympic Games in Mexico City, and Eiko's parents had been unwilling to have her wait to marry until after the Games.

In his suicide note, Tsuburaya paid thanks to his parents, siblings and trainers for their contributions, hoped his nieces and nephews would grow up well, and asked for forgiveness from his parents. He left two handwritten notes as explanation for why he took his life.

His suicide note reads as such:

References 

1940 births
1968 suicides
Sportspeople from Fukushima Prefecture
Military personnel from Fukushima Prefecture
Japan Ground Self-Defense Force personnel
Japanese male long-distance runners
Japanese male marathon runners
Olympic male long-distance runners
Olympic male marathon runners
Olympic athletes of Japan
Olympic bronze medalists for Japan
Olympic bronze medalists in athletics (track and field)
Athletes (track and field) at the 1964 Summer Olympics
Medalists at the 1964 Summer Olympics
Japan Championships in Athletics winners
Japanese military personnel who committed suicide
Suicides by sharp instrument in Japan
People from Sukagawa